A scan line (also scanline) is one line, or row, in a raster scanning pattern, such as a line of video on a cathode ray tube (CRT) display of a television set or computer monitor.

On CRT screens the horizontal scan lines are visually discernible, even when viewed from a distance, as alternating colored lines and black lines, especially when a progressive scan signal with below maximum vertical resolution is displayed. This is sometimes used today as a visual effect in computer graphics.

The term is used, by analogy, for a single row of pixels in a raster graphics image.
Scan lines are important in representations of image data, because many image file formats have special rules for data at the end of a scan line. For example, there may be a rule that each scan line starts on a particular boundary (such as a byte or word; see for example BMP file format). This means that even otherwise compatible raster data may need to be analyzed at the level of scan lines in order to convert between formats.

See also
Interlaced video
Scanline rendering
Flicker (screen)
Stroboscopic effect

References 

Computer graphics
Image processing
Display technology
Video signal
History of television
Television terminology